The Best American Short Stories 2009, a volume in The Best American Short Stories series, was edited by Heidi Pitlor and by guest editor Alice Sebold.

Short stories included

Notes

2009 anthologies
Fiction anthologies
Short Stories 2009
Houghton Mifflin books